Garth O. V. Manton (born 16 December 1929) is an Australian rower who competed in the 1956 Summer Olympics. His senior rowing was with the Mercantile Rowing Club in Melbourne. In 1956 he was a crew member of the Australian boat which won the bronze medal in the eights event.

External links
 

1929 births
Living people
Australian male rowers
Olympic rowers of Australia
Rowers at the 1956 Summer Olympics
Olympic bronze medalists for Australia
Olympic medalists in rowing
Medalists at the 1956 Summer Olympics
20th-century Australian people